Historia Plantarum (The History of Plants) is a botany book by John Ray, published in 1686.

Publication
Historia Plantarum was published in three volumes: vol 1 in 1686, vol 2 in 1688, vol 3 in 1704. The third volume lacked plates, so Ray's assistant, the apothecary James Petiver, published Petiver's Catalogue, effectively a supplement containing the plates, in parts in 1715–1764. The work on the first two volumes was supported by subscriptions from the President and Fellows of the Royal Society.

Editions
 Ray, John (1686). Historia plantarum. London: Clark.  Vol 1 -  Vol 2 - Vol 3

References

Sources
 
 Raven, Charles E. (1950). John Ray, naturalist: his life and works. Cambridge University Press.

Botany books
1686 books
History of botany